The common warthog (Phacochoerus africanus) is a wild member of the pig family (Suidae) found in grassland, savanna, and woodland in sub-Saharan Africa. In the past, it was commonly treated as a subspecies of P. aethiopicus, but today that scientific name is restricted to the desert warthog of northern Kenya, Somalia, and eastern Ethiopia.

Subspecies
Nolan warthog (P. a. africanus) Gmelin, 1788 – Burkina Faso, Ivory Coast, Democratic Republic of the Congo, Ethiopia, Ghana, Guinea-Bissau, Chad, Mauritania, Nigeria, Senegal, Sudan
Eritrean warthog (P. a. aeliani) Cretzschmar, 1828 – Eritrea, Ethiopia, Djibouti, Somalia
Central African warthog (P. a. massaicus) Lönnberg, 1908 – Kenya, Tanzania
Southern warthog (P. a. sundevallii) Lönnberg, 1908 – Angola, Botswana, Namibia, South Africa, Zimbabwe

Description

A warthog is identifiable by the two pairs of tusks protruding from the mouth and curving upwards. The lower pair, which is far shorter than the upper pair, becomes razor-sharp by rubbing against the upper pair every time the mouth is opened and closed. A tusk will curve 90° or more from the root, and will not lie flat on a table, as it curves somewhat backwards as it grows. The tusks are not used for digging, but are used for combat with other hogs and in defense against predators – the lower set can inflict severe wounds.

Common warthog ivory is taken from the constantly growing canine teeth. The tusks, particularly the upper set, work in much the same way as elephant tusks with all designs scaled down. Tusks are carved predominantly for the tourist trade in eastern and southern Africa.

The head of the common warthog is large, with a mane down the spine to the middle of the back. Sparse hair covers the body. Its color is usually black or brown. Tails are long and end with a tuft of hair. Common warthogs do not have subcutaneous fat and the coat is sparse, making them susceptible to extreme environmental temperatures.

Ecology

The common warthog is the only pig species that has adapted to grazing and savanna habitats. Its diet is omnivorous, composed of grasses, roots, berries and other fruits, bark, fungi, insects, eggs and carrion. The diet is seasonably variable, depending on availability of different food items. During the wet seasons, warthogs graze on short perennial grasses. During the dry seasons, they subsist on bulbs, rhizomes, and nutritious roots. 

Warthogs are powerful diggers, using both their snouts and feet. When feeding, they often bend their front feet backwards and move around on the wrists. Calloused pads that protect the wrists during such movement form early in the development of the fetus. Although they can dig their own burrows, they often occupy abandoned burrows of aardvarks and other animals. The common warthog commonly reverses into burrows, with its head facing the opening and ready to burst out if necessary. Common warthogs will wallow in mud to cope with high temperatures and huddle together to cope with low temperatures.

Although capable of fighting (males fight each other during mating season), the common warthog's primary defense is to flee by means of fast sprinting. The common warthog's main predators are humans, lions, leopards, cheetahs, crocodiles, wild dogs and hyenas. Birds of prey such as Verreaux's eagle owls and martial eagles sometimes prey on piglets. However, a female common warthog will defend her piglets aggressively. On occasion, common warthogs have been observed charging and even wounding large predators. Common warthogs have also been observed allowing banded mongooses and vervet monkeys to groom them to remove ticks.

Social behavior and reproduction

Common warthogs are not territorial, but instead occupy a home range. Common warthogs live in groups called sounders.  Females live in sounders with their young and with other females. Females tend to stay in their natal groups, while males leave, but stay within the home range. Subadult males associate in bachelor groups, but males live alone when they become adults. Adult males only join sounders with estrous females. Warthogs have two facial glands: the tusk gland and the sebaceous gland. Common warthogs of both sexes begin to mark around six to seven months old. Males tend to mark more than females. They mark sleeping and feeding areas and waterholes. Common warthogs use tusk marking for courtship, for antagonistic behaviors, and to establish status.

Common warthogs are seasonal breeders. Rutting begins in the late rainy or early dry season and birthing begins near the start of the following rainy season. The mating system is described as "overlap promiscuity": the males have ranges overlapping several female ranges, and the daily behavior of the female is unpredictable. Boars employ two mating strategies during the rut. With the "staying tactic", a boar will stay and defend certain females or a resource valuable to them. In the "roaming tactic", boars seek out estrous sows and compete for them. Boars will wait for sows to emerge from their burrows. A dominant boar will displace any other boar that also tries to court his female. When a sow leaves her den, the boar will try to demonstrate his dominance and then follow her before copulation. For the "staying tactic", monogamy, female-defense polygyny, or resource-defense polygyny is promoted, while the "roaming tactic" promotes scramble-competition polygyny.

The typical gestation period is five to six months. When they are about to give birth, sows temporarily leave their families to farrow in a separate hole. The litter is two to eight piglets, with two to four typical. The sow will stay in the burrow for several weeks, nursing her piglets. Common warthog sows have been observed to nurse foster piglets if they lose their own litter. This behavior, known as allosucking, makes them cooperative breeders. Allosucking does not seem to be a case of mistaken identity or milk theft, and may be a sign of kin altruism. Piglets begin grazing at about two to three weeks and are weaned by six months. Piglets quickly attain mobility and stay close to their mothers for defense. Common warthogs live for an average of 7 to 11 years in the wild. Captive specimens on the other hand can live for an average of 21 years.

Conservation status
As of 1999, the common warthog population in southern Africa was estimated to be about 250,000. The species is susceptible to drought and hunting (especially with dogs), which may result in localized extinctions. The common warthog is present in numerous protected areas across its extensive range.

As an Invasive Species
In 2020, it has been noted that a population of warthogs, descendants of escaped individuals from game ranches, are running free in southern Texas.

Related species
 Metridiochoerus – extinct giant warthog
 Wild boar

References

External links

common warthog
Mammals of Sub-Saharan Africa
common warthog
Taxa named by Johann Friedrich Gmelin

el:Φακόχοιρος
fr:Phacochère